Simbumbumbu  is a village under Chief Khulumani Mathema, with a sub-village  named Magumpo under the hand of Ranold Dlamini (kraal head), located northeast of its main centre. The village serves as a main business centre to its neighboring villages i.e. Gqalaza, Mawanke Mayezane and Mapane. The schools in Simbumbumbu, (primary and secondary), has been faced with the problems of underdevelopment since the early 2000s. Due to the aid of a few non government organizations, like Family Impact as well as UNICEF together with the strong joint application force of the community, a great improvement has occurred on the infrastructure of the schools. Almost from the year 2010 education outcome at Simbumbumbu both primary and secondary, has improved by almost 12% as far as the statistics is concerned. The village occupied by the Ndebele origins is so proud of all the individuals who helped it maneuver its way out of education boundaries.  ward 7 in Gwanda District of Matabeleland South province in southern Zimbabwe.

Simbumbumbu is home  to Khithiza FC, the local football club which was formed in the late 1990s by Ndaba.

Wards of Zimbabwe
Gwanda District